Evandro Silva Resende (or simply Evandro, born May 10, 1986 in Brazil) is a Brazilian football striker who currently plays for Francana.

Club career
He joined Saipa in 2007. In 2008, he returned to Brazil and signed for Rio Branco Atlético Clube. He currently plays for Americano Futebol Clube.

References

Brazilian footballers
Saipa F.C. players
Americano Futebol Clube players
Expatriate footballers in Iran
Brazilian expatriate footballers
1986 births
Living people
Association football forwards